Phil Caliva (born January 1, 1945 in Palermo, Sicily) is an Italian-born American racing driver who competed in the CART Championship Car series from 1979 to 1984.  After racing in the North American Formula Super Vee series in 1977 and 1978, he made his CART debut in 1979 driving for Spike Gehlhausen at Ontario Motor Speedway.  Caliva returned the next year and made five starts for Bill Alsup and tried but failed to qualify for the Indianapolis 500.  Caliva attempted a second time to qualify for the "500" for Alsup in 1981 but again failed to make the field.  He made 3 more starts later that year, including his best series finish of 8th place at the Michigan International Speedway in July.  He tried 3 races including the Indy 500 in 1982 but failed to qualify for all of them.  He tried the Indy 500 again in 1983 and missed the field again, but made the race at Riverside International Raceway in what would be his last Champ Car start.  He tried the Long Beach race and the Indy 500 again in 1984 but again missed both races.

In total, Caliva made 10 starts and failed to qualify or start 10 more times, including 5 failed attempts at the Indy 500.  His best points finish was 22nd place in the 1981 season.

Racing record

Complete USAC Mini-Indy Series results

Indy 500 results

External links
Phil Caliva at ChampCarStats.com

1945 births
American racing drivers
Italian racing drivers
Champ Car drivers
Living people
Sportspeople from Palermo